M. Y. Patil  is an Indian politician and a current member of the 2018 Karnataka Legislative Assembly election from Afzalpur (Vidhana Sabha constituency) as an Indian National Congress candidate. He was elected to 2004 Karnataka Legislative Assembly (MLA) from Afzalpur Vidhana Sabha constituency as a Janata Dal (Secular) candidate.
He got support from many leaders like Mallikarjun Kharge, Priyank M. Kharge and ex HKE President Basavaraj Bhimalli played a key role to defeat Malikayya Guttedar.

Political career
2008 contested from Afzalpur Vidhana constituency to Karnataka Legislative Assembly as BJP candidate and lost.
2013 contested from Afzalpur Vidhana constituency to Karnataka Legislative Assembly as KJP candidate and lost.
2004 - 2013 MLA Afzalpur Vidhana Sabha constituency as Janata Dal (Secular) candidate.
2018 MLA Afzalpur Vidhana Sabha constituency as INC candidate.

References

Living people
People from Kalaburagi district
Indian National Congress politicians from Karnataka
1941 births
Janata Party politicians
Janata Dal (Secular) politicians
Karnataka MLAs 1978–1983
Karnataka MLAs 2004–2007
Karnataka MLAs 2018–2023